The Johnny Cash discography chronicles the output of American singer Johnny Cash. His lengthy career, spanning 1954 to 2003, saw the release of 91 albums and 170 singles on several record labels. Over the years, Cash also collaborated with many of the industry's most notable artists.

See also Johnny Cash albums discography

Singles

1955–1958: Sun years

1958–1985: Columbia years 
Color key

1950s

1960s

1970s

1980s

1987–1991: Mercury years

1980s

1990s 

A "Farmer's Almanac" did not chart on Hot Country Songs, but peaked at No. 10 on Hot Country Radio Breakouts.

Since 1991: American Recordings years and posthumous releases

1990s

2000s and 2010s

Other singles

Promotional singles

Singles with June Carter Cash

Singles with Waylon Jennings

Singles with Waylon Jennings, Willie Nelson and Kris Kristofferson

The Highwaymen's first two albums and singles released from them were credited to "Waylon Jennings, Willie Nelson, Johnny Cash, Kris Kristofferson".

A "Born and Raised in Black and White" did not chart on Hot Country Songs, but peaked at No. 1 on Hot Country Radio Breakouts.

Guest singles

Music videos

References

 Whitburn, Joel. Joel Whitburn's Bubbling Under Singles & Albums (1998): 42.

External links
 The official Johnny Cash site

 
Country music discographies
Discographies of American artists
Folk music discographies
Rock music discographies